Economic Society of South Africa (ESSA), established in 1925 is a "discussion forum" for South African economists in academic life, government and business.  It is currently chaired by Prof. Heinrich Bohlmann for the 2021-2023 term.

The Society has large and diverse membership. Over the years members have played a major role in applying economic thinking to and analysing South African economic issues .  Distinguished members of the Society have included Cabinet Ministers, Governors of the South African Reserve Bank, Chief Executives of Companies, Directors-General of Government Departments, and internationally acclaimed academics.

ESSA publishes the South African Journal of Economics, established in 1933, which is one of the leading international regional journals. The journal covers the discipline in general, including methodology and economic history and, in more recent times, econometrics.  Its editorial organisation has recently been extended to allow for a more effective editing of papers on specialised topics.

See also
Economy of South Africa
Economics Research South Africa
Economic History Society of Southern Africa
Investment Analysts Society of Southern Africa

External links
Economic Society of South Africa
The South African Journal of Economics

Research institutes in South Africa
Economy of South Africa
Economics societies
1925 establishments in South Africa
Organizations established in 1925